The 2012 Monmouth Hawks Devils football team represented Monmouth University in the 2012 NCAA Division I FCS football season as a member of the Northeast Conference. They were led by 20th- year head coach Kevin Callahan and played their home games at Kessler Field. They finished the season 5–5 overall and 4–3 in NEC play to place third.

This was the Hawks last season as a member of the NEC. In July 2013, Monmouth athletics moved to the Metro Atlantic Athletic Conference. However, the MAAC does not sponsor football, so the Hawks played the 2013 season as an FCS independent before joining the Big South Conference as a football-only member in 2014.

Schedule

Central Connecticut game on November 3 cancelled due to effect from Hurricane Sandy.

References

Monmouth
Monmouth Hawks football seasons
Monmouth Hawks football